This is a list of seasons by the NorthPort Batang Pier of the Philippine Basketball Association.

Season-by-season records
*one-game playoffs**team had the twice-to-beat advantage

Per season records